Sally Can't Dance is the fourth solo studio album by American musician Lou Reed, released in August 1974 by RCA Records. Steve Katz and Reed produced the album. It remains Reed's highest-charting album in the United States, having peaked at #10 during a 14-week stay on the Billboard 200 album chart in October 1974. It is also the first solo Lou Reed album not to feature any songs originally recorded by Reed's earlier band, the Velvet Underground, as well as the first of Reed's solo studio albums to be recorded in the United States (Reed's previous three albums were all recorded in the United Kingdom). The album art was designed by noted Fillmore and Broadway poster artist David Edward Byrd and was one of the few album covers he ever designed.

Background
Aside from the title song, Sally Can't Dance includes "N.Y. Stars" (in which Reed pokes fun at "fourth-rate imitators" who tried to impress him by copying his style), "Kill Your Sons" (a reflection of his stay in a psychiatric hospital at his parents' insistence, during his teen years), and "Billy," about the fate of a schoolmate with more "normal" ambitions than he'd had. The latter track reunited Reed with erstwhile Velvet Underground bandmate Doug Yule, playing bass guitar. According to an interview with Yule, the call from Reed was "out of the blue", because Reed thought Yule's bass playing style would work well on the song "Billy", and Yule agreed to play on the song saying he "liked it" and that he had enjoyed the session. More tracks featuring Yule have emerged on a CD re-issue. The album's tour featured Danny Weis, on guitar; Michael Fonfara, on keyboards; Prakash John, on bass and Pentti "Whitey" Glan, on drums on the European leg. Eric "Mouse" Johnson played drums on the Australian and U.S. sections. The sound engineer for all the live shows was Robin Mayhew, who had previously worked with David Bowie during his Ziggy Stardust period. The following year, Reed contacted Doug Yule again to play guitar on his 1975 world tour.

While the record was a hit and elevated Reed's status as a star, he reportedly was disappointed in its production (in which he took a largely passive role) and the treatment of the songs. Reed remarked, "It seems like the less I'm involved with a record, the bigger a hit it becomes. If I weren't on the record at all next time around, it might go to Number One."

Following the relative critical successes of Transformer, Berlin and Rock 'n' Roll Animal, Sally Can't Dance received largely negative reviews.

Cash Box said of the title song "a bluesy narrative type of vocal singing has made Reed as distinctive a performer as any" that has  "the same hit feel" as "Take a Walk on the Wild Side."

In 1974, however, RCA insisted on a rapid follow-up album while Reed's career appeared to be peaking. Tiring of the pressure put on him, and with his contract requiring RCA to release whatever record he gave them, Reed handed over the master tape of Metal Machine Music—an hour of feedback and noise, with no chance of becoming a hit.

Track listing
All tracks are written by Lou Reed.

Side one
 "Ride Sally Ride" – 4:06
 "Animal Language" – 3:05
 "Baby Face" – 5:06
 "N.Y. Stars" – 4:02

Side two
 "Kill Your Sons" – 3:40
 "Ennui" – 3:43
 "Sally Can't Dance" – 4:12
 "Billy" – 5:10

Bonus tracks
 "Good Taste" – 3:30
 "Sally Can't Dance" (single version) – 2:56

Personnel
Credits are adapted from the Sally Can't Dance liner notes.

Musicians
 Lou Reed – vocals, acoustic guitar on "Billy"
 Danny Weis – guitar, tambourine, backing vocals, horn arrangement
 Paul Fleisher – saxophone on "Billy"
 David Taylor, Lou Marini, Trevor Koehler, Jon Faddis, Alan Rubin, Alex Foster, Lew Soloff – horns
 Steve Katz – harmonica, horn arrangement
 Michael Fonfara – piano, keyboards, Mellotron on "Ennui"
 Prakash John – bass guitar, backing vocals
 Doug Yule – bass guitar on "Billy"
 Ritchie Dharma – drums on "Kill Your Sons" and "Ennui"
 Pentti "Whitey" Glan – drums
 Doug Bartenfeld – guitar
 Michael Wendroff – backing vocals
 Joanne Vent – backing vocals
 Lew Soloff and Martin Sheller - horn arrangements

Production and artwork
 Steve Katz – producer
 Lou Reed – producer 
 Mike Stone – recording engineer
 Ralph Moss – remix engineer
 Dennis Katz – cover concept
 Acy Lehman – art direction
 David Edward Byrd – cover art
 Mick Rock – photography

Charts

See also
List of albums released in 1974
Lou Reed's discography

References

External links

1974 albums
Lou Reed albums
RCA Records albums
Albums produced by Lou Reed
Albums recorded at Electric Lady Studios
Albums with cover art by Mick Rock